Woodbine, also known as the Anders Rasmussen House, is a historic early-20th-century estate located at New Albany, Floyd County, Indiana.  It was built in 1920 for Anders Rasmussen, who owned a florist business in New Albany and once served as a florist for the King of Denmark.  The -story Bungalow / American Craftsman-style house is made of stucco, brick, limestone, asphalt, and terra cotta, with a full basement. The house includes a -story caretaker's apartment.  The house stayed with the family until 1945, and has gone through several hands since then. The estate is currently owed and being restored by the owner/winemaker for Downtown New Albany's River City Winery located just two miles away.  Plans for a vineyard on the estate are underway.

It was listed on the National Register of Historic Places in 1994.

References

Buildings and structures in New Albany, Indiana
Houses on the National Register of Historic Places in Indiana
Houses completed in 1920
Houses in Floyd County, Indiana
National Register of Historic Places in Floyd County, Indiana